Pontificio may refer to:

The Annuario Pontificio is the annual directory of the Holy See.
The Pontificio Collegio Filippino is the college of Filipino diocesan priests studying at pontifical universities in Rome, Italy
The Maggiordomo Pontificio was one of the three palatine prelates concerning whom particulars have been given in the article maestro di camera